The 2023 Nigerian presidential election was held on 25 February 2023 to elect the president and vice president of Nigeria. Bola Tinubu, a former Governor of Lagos State and nominee of the All Progressives Congress, won the disputed election with 36.61% of the vote, 8,794,726 total votes. Runners-up were former Vice President Atiku Abubakar, Peoples Democratic Party, and former Governor of Anambra State Peter Obi, Labour Party, who both immediately contested the result; Obi claimed he won. Other federal elections, including elections to the House of Representatives and the Senate, held on the same date while state elections were scheduled to hold two weeks afterward on 11 March, but were postponed by a week and will be held on 18 March. The inauguration is set for 29 May 2023.

The candidates were nominated in the party primaries conducted between 4 April and 9 June 2022. Incumbent APC President Muhammadu Buhari was term-limited and could not seek re-election for a third term.  The New Nigeria Peoples Party nominated former Governor of Kano State Rabiu Kwankwaso. In the weeks after the primaries, vice presidential running mates were announced with Abubakar choosing Governor Ifeanyi Okowa. Obi selecting former Senator Yusuf Datti Baba-Ahmed, Tinubu picking Senator Kashim Shettima, and Kwankwaso choosing pastor Isaac Idahosa.

The general election was noted by initially high projected turnout and mainly peaceful voting but was marred by reports of vote buying, voter intimidation, attacks on polling units in certain areas, and unpunctual electoral officials along with accusations of outright fraud; to compound issues with trust in the election, Independent National Electoral Commission officials failed to upload polling unit results to the INEC result viewing portal as previously assured would happen on election day. As state results started to be announced on 26 February at the national collation centre in Abuja, opposition emerged as results data had still not been fully uploaded prior to their announcement in accordance with the law. These circumstances along with statements critical of INEC from observers and civil society groups led the Abubakar, Obi, and Kwankwaso campaigns to question and then officially reject the announced election results by 28 February. All three main opposition campaigns, in addition to some civil society groups and former President Olusegun Obasanjo, called on the commission to rerun the election due to fraud and violence. Meanwhile, the Tinubu campaign praised the commission and called for the arrest of PDP spokesmen for "incitement of violence". In the early morning of 1 March, INEC Chairman Mahmood Yakubu declared Tinubu as the victor after all state results were collated. In response, Abubakar, Obi, and Kwankwaso rejected and vowed to challenge the results. On 2 March Peter Obi claimed he won the election and will prove it, but this hasn't materialized as of 11 March.

Electoral system 
The President of Nigeria is elected using a modified two-round system with up to three rounds. To be elected in the first round, a candidate must receive a plurality of the national vote and over 25% of the vote in at least 24 of the 36 states and the Federal Capital Territory. If no candidate passes this threshold, a second round is held between the top candidate and the candidate winning the second-highest number of states. To win in the second round, a candidate must still receive the most votes nationally and over 25% of the vote in at least 24 of the 36 states and the Federal Capital Territory. If neither candidate passes this threshold, a third round is held where a simple majority of the national vote is required to be elected.

Background
After the first term of Muhammadu Buhari as President, he won re-election to the office as the nominee of the All Progressives Congress by defeating Atiku Abubakar of the People's Democratic Party with a margin of 14 percentage points—nearly 4 million votes. For the legislative elections, the APC solidified its majorities in both the House of Representatives and the Senate after nearly losing the majorities due to defections in 2018. On the state level, the PDP gained two governorships in total as the party gained four governorships from the APC while the APC gained two governorships from the PDP. During the first two years of the 2019–2023 term, the APC expanded slightly through the defections of dozens of state and federal legislators and three governors—Ebonyi State's Dave Umahi, Cross River State's Benedict Ayade, and Zamfara State's Bello Muhammad Matawalle—but went through a prolonged leadership crisis; for the PDP, the losses through defection took a toll but the party resolved its leadership crisis and held a peaceful convention. During the second half of the term, both parties were hit by defections but the APC held its long-postponed convention and the PDP underwent public disputes over not zoning its presidential nomination.

Ahead of Buhari's second term, his promises included the completion of in-process rail lines and other infrastructure projects, the further inclusion of women in government, educational reform, and increasing anti-corruption initiatives. In terms of his performance, the administration was commended for improving the agriculture sector, finishing infrastructure projects, successful advances in the fight against terrorists in the northeast, securing the return of previously looted public funds from abroad, and increasing the minimum wage. However, he faced criticism for abandoning anti-corruption initiatives, poor quality of life, an increasingly dire security situation outside of the northeast (bandits and some terrorist expansion in the North West, herder-farmer and interethnic conflicts in the North Central, pirates and illegal oil bunkering gangs in the Niger Delta, and a violent separatist movement in the South East along with nationwide kidnapping and security force brutality epidemics), and increasing national debt.

Buhari also came under fire for instituting a seven-month long national ban on Twitter after the site removed an abusive tweet he posted in reference to the Civil War; the ban was decried as a failed attempt at censorship. Another key source of controversy was the administration's handling of the October 2020 protest wave of the End SARS movement with the most fervent criticism emerging over the Lekki massacre when soldiers in Lagos killed multiple peaceful protesters before the Army and administration attempted to deny the shooting ever took place.

Buhari also had to contend with a fluctuating, but consistently low, approval rating.

Primary elections
The primaries, along with any potential challenges to primary results, were to take place between 4 April and 3 June 2022 but the deadline was extended to 9 June. An informal zoning gentlemen's agreement sets the South (the South East, South South, and South West geopolitical zones) to have the next President as Buhari, a Northerner, was elected twice. Another informal convention calls for nominees to have vice presidential running mates from a different region and religion as themselves. Despite the arrangement, most parties did not formally close their primaries to non-Southern candidates or officially designate that their tickets cannot have running mates of the same religion.

Both the APC and PDP had heated internal debates over zoning and same religion tickets in the year ahead of the primary. Despite the informal convention, the People's Democratic Party declined to formally zone its nomination in early May 2022 before going against the convention to nominate northerner Atiku Abubakar; the All Progressives Congress also declined to formally zone its nomination but later nominated a southerner, Bola Tinubu, as its flagbearer. The APC, however, did break the other major convention by picking a same religion ticket; the PDP did not.

All Progressives Congress 

With Muhammadu Buhari having been elected to the presidency twice, he was ineligible for renomination. In July 2021, then-national APC Caretaker Chairman and Yobe State Governor Mai Mala Buni backed the consensus method of nominating a presidential candidate instead of the more common direct or indirect primary methods but the party did not come to a decision on the primary method at the time. During Buni's term as Caretaker Chairman from 2020 to 2022, he campaigned heavily for prominent PDP members to defect to the APC, weakening the opposition's caucus in the National Assembly and gaining three governors—Ebonyi State's Dave Umahi, Cross River State's Benedict Ayade, and Zamfara State's Bello Muhammad Matawalle—in 2020 and 2021. However, the APC's electoral performance and party unity were more mixed as it came a distant third in the 2021 Anambra State gubernatorial election and was still beset by infighting. The APC primary was framed in the wider context of internal party feuds stemming from the APC's formation in 2013 and pre-2019 election party crises to the 2020 removal of party leadership and contentious 2021 state party congresses. The ability of the APC national caretaker committee to resolve state party factionizations and properly organize the 2022 national party convention was seen as vital for both the APC's presidential chances and its future as a party. After several postponements, the convention was successfully held on 26 March 2022 despite some controversy over the consensus method used for most party offices.

In terms of zoning, there was no announced formal zoning agreement for the APC nomination despite calls from certain politicians and interest groups such as the Southern Governors' Forum to zone the nomination to the South as Buhari, a Northerner, was elected twice. Countering its proponents were prospective candidates from the North and the Northern Governors' Forum, which did not oppose a southern presidency but initially disagreed with formal zoning. On the other hand, there were few proponents of a same religion ticket, mainly supporters and allies of eventual nominee Bola Tinubu who argued that there were few powerful Northern Christian APC politicians who could be his running mate. Allies of other potential candidates and groups like the Christian Association of Nigeria came out strongly against the idea of a same religion ticket on grounds of national unity and religious harmony.

On 20 April 2022, the APC National Executive Committee announced the party timetable for the presidential primary and that the primary would use the indirect primary method. The announcement set the party's expression of interest form price at ₦30 million and the nomination form price at ₦70 million with a 50% nomination form discount for candidates younger than 40 while women and candidates with disabilities get free nomination forms. Forms were to be sold from 26 April to 6 May until the deadline was later extended to 10 May then 12 May. After the submission of nomination forms by 13 May, candidates were to be screened by a party committee on 24 and 25 May but it was delayed several times to while the screening appeal process will take place afterwards. Ward congresses and LGA congresses were rescheduled for between 12 and 14 May to elect "ad hoc delegates" for the primary. Candidates approved by the screening process were to advance to a primary set for 30 May and 1 June but the party delayed the primary to 6–8 June.

Before the primary, controversy over the prospective electors emerged due to the legal ramifications of the amended Electoral Act. After years of debate and public pressure, Buhari signed a new Electoral Act in January 2022 that drastically reformed election and electoral systems for both primary and general elections. One of the reforms was the exclusion of ex officio "statutory delegates"—thousands of current and former officeholders—from voting in party primaries; National Assembly leadership said the exclusion was inadvertent and in May, NASS passed an amendment to the act to allow statutory delegates to vote in primaries. However, Buhari refused to sign the amendment into law, forcing the APC to suddenly prohibit statutory delegates from voting. Not only did the action prevent Buhari and other high-ranking officeholders from voting, it drastically reduced the number of delegates from over 7,800 to just the 2,322 elected "ad hoc delegates."

The pre-primary period was dominated by questions about major candidates and Buhari's endorsement. Of the formally announced candidates, analysts viewed six as the major contenders: Rotimi Amaechi—former Minister of Transportation and former Governor of Rivers State, Kayode Fayemi—Governor of Ekiti State, Ahmad Lawan—Senate President, Yemi Osinbajo—Vice President, former science minister Ogbonnaya Onu, and Bola Tinubu—former Governor of Lagos State; however, two potential surprises emerged: former President Goodluck Jonathan and Governor of the Central Bank Godwin Emefiele. Groups purchasing forms on behalf of Emefiele and Jonathan coupled with months of speculation about their candidacies led to rumours of a plot to impose one of the two as nominee despite the legally-mandated nonpartisanship of Emefiele's office and Jonathan's membership in the PDP; neither candidacy came to fruition as Jonathan refused the forms, while Emefiele was forced to withdraw due to public pressure. The other main question was Buhari's endorsement; despite months of contending that he would not weigh in on the primary, about a week before the primary, Buhari held a meeting with APC governors where he asked them to support his preferred candidate. Reports emerged that while the vast majority of governors agreed, a few rejected the proposal or did not state their position. Another point of contention was the oft-postponed candidate screening, where a committee led by former APC National Chairman John Odigie Oyegun cleared all twenty-three candidates but recommended only thirteen candidates continue their campaigns due to their perceived chances of victory.

In the days directly before the primary, the vast majority of northern APC governors released a letter in support of a southern nominee where they also asked northern candidates to withdraw; in response, one northern candidate withdrew from the primary. Later that day (4 June 2022), Buhari held a meeting with most APC candidates where he reportedly privately backed a nominee from the south and told the candidates to find a consensus nominee amongst themselves. However, on 6 June—the day before primary voting, national party chairman Abdullahi Adamu told northern APC governors that the party's (and Buhari's) consensus candidate would be Lawan; the announcement was met with opposition by governors and other members of the party's National Working Committee leading the party to backtrack and claim that Adamu was just expressing his personal opinion. The same day, Buhari stated that he had no anointed candidate in the primary. Then early on primary day, APC governors and the party NWC made a joint recommendation of five southern candidates—Amaechi, Fayemi, Osinbajo, Tinubu, and Governor of Ebonyi State Dave Umahi—to Buhari while asking all other aspirants to withdraw from the race. Seven other candidates released a joint statement rejecting the shortlist while all six southeastern candidates penned a letter to Buhari asking that the nomination be zoned to the South-East.

On the day of the primary, delegates gathered in Eagle Square, Abuja to be accredited and vote. The early part of the exercise was beset by logistical issues as there were significant delays in both delegate and journalist accreditation along with the deployment of tear gas by security to disperse crowds. Meanwhile, inside the Square, Economic and Financial Crimes Commission personnel took positions to prevent bribery before candidates gave their final speeches to the delegates before voting. During these speeches, six candidates—Godswill Akpabio, Ibikunle Amosun, Dimeji Bankole, Robert Ajayi Boroffice, Fayemi, and Uju Kennedy Ohanenye—stepped down in favour of Tinubu and one aspirant—Nicholas Felix—withdrew for Osinbajo while the remaining candidates issued promises and proposals for their prospective campaigns. After the candidate's speeches and an address by Buhari, voting began in the early morning of 8 June and after hours of voting, votes were publicly tabulated. When collation was completed, Bola Tinubu emerged as nominee after results showed him winning 60% of the votes with a margin of 45% over runner-up Amaechi. In his acceptance speech, Tinubu thanked his team while striking a conciliatory tone in regards to his former opponents. Post-primary analysis noted multiple potential reasons for Tinubu's victory, namely: other candidates' focus on a Buhari endorsement that never came, the failure of Buhari's succession plan, bribery, and the last-minute withdrawals. The week after the primary were based around the search for Tinubu's running mate, as Tinubu is a southern Muslim it was expected that his running mate would be a northern Christian but controversy emerged as some prominent APC politicians stated their openness to a Muslim-Muslim ticket. As the deadline neared, the party submitted the name of Kabir Ibrahim Masari—a politician and party operative from Katsina State—as a placeholder vice presidential nominee to be substituted at a later date. On 10 July, Ibrahim Masari withdrew and Tinubu announced Kashim Shettima—a senator and former Governor of Borno State—as his running mate after a meeting with Buhari in Daura. Breaking the anti-same religion ticket convention, Tinubu argued in a statement that "religion...cannot always and fully determine our path" and that he picked "the man who can help me bring the best governance to all Nigerians, period, regardless of their religious affiliation" and compared the ticket to the last Yoruba Muslim-Kanuri Muslim ticket, the successful M. K. O. Abiola-Baba Gana Kingibe slate in 1993. Opponents, like the Christian Association of Nigeria and civil society groups, derided the pick as divisive in a trying time for Nigerian unity. Analysts noted the previous reports from before Tinubu was nominated that said his inner circle did not think a Northern Christian would help the party in the majority-Muslim states and thus a fellow Muslim should be picked.

Nominated 
 Bola Tinubu: former Governor of Lagos State (1999–2007) and former Senator for Lagos West (1992–1993)
 Running mate—Kashim Shettima: Senator for Borno Central (2019–present), former Governor of Borno State (2011–2019), and son of former Governor of Northern Nigeria Kashim Ibrahim

Eliminated in primary 
 Rotimi Amaechi: former Minister of Transportation (2015–2019; 2019–2022), former Governor of Rivers State (2007–2015), and former Speaker of the Rivers State House of Assembly (1999–2007)
 Benedict Ayade: Governor of Cross River State (2015–present) and former Senator for Cross River North (2011–2015)
 Tunde Bakare: pastor
 Yahaya Bello: Governor of Kogi State (2016–present)
 Tein Jack-Rich: businessman
 Ahmad Lawan: Senator for Yobe North (2007–present), President of the Senate (2019–present), and former House of Representatives member for Bade/Jakusko (1999–2007)
 Ikeobasi Mokelu: former Minister of Information and Culture
 Chukwuemeka Nwajiuba: former Minister of State for Education (2019–2022) and former House of Representatives member for Ehime Mbano/Ihitte Uboma/Obowo (2019; 1999–2003)
 Rochas Okorocha: Senator for Imo West (2019–present) and former Governor of Imo State (2011–2019)
 Ogbonnaya Onu: former Minister of Science, Technology and Innovation (2015–2019; 2019–2022) and former Governor of Abia State (1992–1993)
 Yemi Osinbajo: Vice President (2015–present)
 Ahmad Sani Yerima: Senator for Zamfara West (2007–2019) and former Governor of Zamfara State (1999–2007)
 Dave Umahi: Governor of Ebonyi State (2015–present) and former Deputy Governor of Ebonyi State (2011–2015)

Withdrew 
 Mohammed Badaru Abubakar: Governor of Jigawa State (2015–present)
 Godswill Akpabio: former Minister of Niger Delta Affairs (2019–2022), former Senator for Akwa Ibom North-West (2015–2019), and former Governor of Akwa Ibom State (2007–2015)
 Ibikunle Amosun: Senator for Ogun Central (2003–2007; 2019–present) and former Governor of Ogun State (2011–2019)
 Moses Ayom: businessman
 Dimeji Bankole: former House of Representatives member for Abeokuta South (2003–2011) and former Speaker of the House of Representatives (2007–2011)
 Robert Ajayi Boroffice: Senator for Ondo North (2011–present)
 Ibrahim Bello Dauda: businessman
 Kayode Fayemi: Governor of Ekiti State (2010–2014; 2018–present) and former Minister of Solid Mineral Development (2015–2018)
 Nicholas Felix: pastor
 Adamu Garba II: businessman (defected before the primary to the YPP to unsuccessfully run in its presidential primary)
 Godwin Emefiele: Governor of the Central Bank of Nigeria (2014–present)
 Orji Uzor Kalu: Senator for Abia North (2019–present) and former Governor of Abia State (1999–2007) (to run for re-election as senator for Abia North)
 Chris Ngige: Minister of Labour and Employment (2015–2019; 2019–present), former Senator for Anambra Central (2011–2015), and former Governor of Anambra State (2003–2006)
 Ken Nnamani: former Senator for Enugu East (2003–2007) and former President of the Senate (2005–2007)
 Uju Kennedy Ohanenye: lawyer
 Gbenga Olawepo-Hashim: activist and businessman
 Adams Oshiomhole: former Governor of Edo State (2008–2016) (to run for senator for Edo North)
 Timipre Sylva: Minister of State for Petroleum Resources (2019–present) and former Governor of Bayelsa State (2007–2008; 2008–2012)

Declined 
 Rauf Aregbesola: Minister of the Interior (2019–present) and former Governor of Osun State (2010–2018)
 Yakubu Dogara: House of Representatives member for Dass/Bogoro/Tafawa Balewa (2007–present) and former Speaker of the House of Representatives (2015–2019)
 Nasir Ahmad el-Rufai: Governor of Kaduna State (2015–present) and former Minister of the Federal Capital Territory (2003–2007)
 Shina Peller: House of Representatives member for Iseyin/Kajola/Iwajowa/Itesiwaju (2019–present)
 Ali Modu Sheriff: Governor of Borno State (2003–2011) and former Senator for Borno Central (1999–2003)
 Babagana Umara Zulum: Governor of Borno State (2019–present)

Primary results

Peoples Democratic Party 

In October 2021, newly elected PDP Chairman Iyorchia Ayu backed the indirect primary method of nominating a presidential candidate instead of the direct or consensus methods. In the year prior to Ayu's election at the October 2021 PDP National Convention, the party had been beset by months of defections from prominent members, most notably of over a dozen National Assembly members and three governors—Ebonyi State's Dave Umahi, Cross River State's Benedict Ayade, and Zamfara State's Bello Muhammad Matawalle; the party also came a distant second in the 2021 Anambra State gubernatorial election and suspended then-national party chair, Uche Secondus. However, the PDP was able to hold its convention without controversy or violence in October, electing nearly all party officials by consensus and inaugurating the full National Working Committee in December.

In terms of zoning, the PDP did not have a formal zoning agreement for the nomination, however, there were calls from certain politicians and interest groups such as the Southern Governors' Forum to zone the nomination to the South as the APC's Buhari, a Northerner, was elected twice. Amid calls for zoning, the party set up an internal committee in March 2022 with a decision on the issue expected by April. However, the decision's release was delayed until May when the party announced that it would not zone its nomination.

On 16 March 2022, the national PDP announced its primary schedule, setting its expression of interest form price at ₦5 million and the nomination form price at ₦35 million with a 50% discount for candidates between 25 and 30. Forms were to be sold from 18 March to 1 April but the party later extended the deadline four times before reaching a final deadline of 22 April. After the submission of nomination forms by 25 April, candidates were screened by a party committee on 29 April while 2 May was the rescheduled date for the screening appeal process. Ward congresses were set for 29 April and LGA congresses were rescheduled for 10 May to elect "ad hoc delegates" for the primary; ex officio "statutory delegates"—thousands of current and former officeholders—will not be electors unlike previous primaries. Candidates approved by the screening process will advance to a primary set for 28 and 29 May.

At the party screening, a committee led by former Senate President David Mark cleared most candidates but disqualified two—Nwachukwu Anakwenze and Cosmos Chukwudi Ndukwe; The disqualifications were then upheld by a screening appeal committee led by Ayu. After the screening, the party's oft-postponed zoning decision was announced with the PDP National Executive Council choosing not to zone the nomination to any particular region, throwing the race open to all candidates. Of the candidates, analysts viewed five as the most likely to win: Atiku Abubakar—former Vice President and 2019 presidential nominee, Peter Obi—former Governor of Anambra State and 2019 vice presidential nominee, Bukola Saraki—former Senate President, Aminu Waziri Tambuwal—Governor of Sokoto State and former Speaker of the House of Representatives, and Nyesom Wike—Governor of Rivers State with a few other notable candidates seen as unlikely to have a chance. However, a few days before the primary, Obi suddenly withdrew from the primary and decamped to the Labour Party.

In the days before the primary, controversy over the prospective electors emerged due to the legal ramifications of the amended Electoral Act. After years of debate and public pressure, Buhari signed a new Electoral Act in January 2022 that drastically reformed election and electoral systems for both primary and general elections. One of the reforms was the exclusion of ex officio "statutory delegates"—thousands of current and former officeholders—from voting in party primaries; National Assembly leadership said the exclusion was inadvertent and in May, NASS passed an amendment to the act to allow statutory delegates to vote in primaries. However, Buhari refused to sign the amendment into law, forcing the PDP to suddenly barr statutory delegates from voting. Not only did the action prevent incumbent governors and other high-ranking officeholders from voting, it drastically reduced the number of delegates to just 810 then 774.

On the day of the primary, delegates gathered in the Velodrome of the Moshood Abiola National Stadium to be accredited and vote. Despite a few unexpected events, including the arrival of Economic and Financial Crimes Commission personnel meant to prevent bribery and the withdrawal of candidate Mohammed Hayatu-Deen in protest of the "obscenely monetized" race, the process continued as every candidate gave a final speech to the delegates before voting. Another surprise came after the speeches, when Tambuwal returned to the dais to withdraw from the primary and direct his delegates to vote for Abubakar. After the withdrawal, voting began and after over an hour of voting, the votes were publicly tabulated. When collation completed, Atiku Abubakar emerged as nominee after results showed him winning just under 50% of the votes with a margin of 18% over runner-up Wike. Later investigations into reported vote breakdowns stated that Abubakar won the majority of delegates from the North West and North East while delegates from the North Central and South West split Abubakar, Saraki, and Wike; delegates 
from the South East and South South also split, mainly between Abubakar and Wike but with Emmanuel winning a portion of the votes. In his acceptance speech, Abubakar vowed to carry the party to victory in the general election on a platform based on unity and economic growth while striking a conciliatory tone in regards to his former opponents. Post-primary analysis noted multiple potential reasons for Abubakar's victory, namely: Tambuwal's withdrawal, Abubakar's public office and campaign experience, the higher number of Northern delegates, and bribery. The weeks after the primary were dominated by the search for Abubakar's running mate, as Abubakar is a northern Muslim it was expected that his running mate would be a southern Christian with Wike, Emmanuel, and Governor of Delta State Ifeanyi Okowa being shortlisted as potential options. On 16 June, Abubakar announced that Okowa would be his running mate; observers noted that despite Okowa's South South origins, his Ika ethnicity could be a nod to southeastern clamours for an Igbo running mate. In the announcement speech, Abubakar said that he consulted party leadership in the search for his running mate and that Okowa was chosen due to his extensive experience and personal qualities.

Nominated 
 Atiku Abubakar: former Vice President (1999–2007)
Running mate—Ifeanyi Okowa: Governor of Delta State (2015–present) and former Senator for Delta North (2011–2015)

Eliminated in primary 
 Anyim Pius Anyim: former Secretary to the Government of the Federation (2011–2015), former President of the Senate (2000–2003), and former Senator for Ebonyi South (1999–2003)
 Udom Gabriel Emmanuel: Governor of Akwa Ibom State (2015–present)
 Ayo Fayose: former Governor of Ekiti State (2003–2006; 2014–2018)
 Chikwendu Kalu: former Speaker of the Abia State House of Assembly
 Bala Mohammed: Governor of Bauchi State (2019–present), former Minister of the Federal Capital Territory (2010–2015), and former Senator for Bauchi South (2007–2010)
 Dele Momodu: journalist, publisher, and businessman
 Sam Ohuabunwa: pharmacist, former president of the Pharmaceutical Society of Nigeria, and brother of former Senator for Abia North Mao Ohuabunwa
 Bukola Saraki: former Senator for Kwara Central (2011–2019), former President of the Senate (2015–2019), and former Governor of Kwara State (2003–2011)
 Diana Oliver Tariela
 Charles Ugwu: real estate developer
 Ezenwo Nyesom Wike: Governor of Rivers State (2015–present) and former Minister of State for Education (2011–2014)

Disqualified by screening committee 
 Nwachukwu Anakwenze: medical doctor
 Cosmos Chukwudi Ndukwe: former Abia State Executive Council official

Withdrew 
 Mohammed Hayatu-Deen: banker and economist
 Peter Obi: former Governor of Anambra State (2006; 2007; 2007–2014) (defected before the primary to the LP to run in its presidential primary)
 Doyin Okupe: physician and former aide to presidents Obasanjo and Jonathan (defected before the primary to the LP)
 Aminu Waziri Tambuwal: Governor of Sokoto State (2015–present), former Speaker of the House of Representatives (2011–2015), and former House of Representatives member for Kebbe/Tambuwal (2003–2015)

Declined 
 Ibrahim Hassan Dankwambo: former Governor of Gombe State (2011–2019)
 Goodluck Jonathan: former President (2010–2015), former Vice President (2007–2010), and former Governor of Bayelsa State (2005–2007)
 Sule Lamido: former Governor of Jigawa State (2007–2015) and former Minister of Foreign Affairs (1999–2003)
 Ahmed Makarfi: former Senator for Kaduna North (2007–2011) and former Governor of Kaduna State (1999–2007)
 Seyi Makinde: Governor of Oyo State (2019–present)
 Sulaiman Mohammed Nazif: former Senator for Bauchi North (2015–2019)
 Ibrahim Shema: former Governor of Katsina State (2007–2015)
 Kabiru Tanimu Turaki: former Minister of Special Duties and Intergovernmental Affairs (2013–2015) and former Supervising Minister of Labour and Productivity (2014–2015)

Primary results

Minor parties 

Accord first scheduled its primary for 2 June before shifting it to 4 June. That day the party nominated entrepreneur, Christopher Imumolen, as its presidential nominee. The nomination was determined by voice vote after all other candidates stepped down. On 25 August, Bello Bala Maru—a former Zamfara State cabinet official—was named as Imumolen's running mate.

The Action Alliance initially scheduled its primary for 3 June 2022 but moved it to 9 June with forms being sold from 4 April to 15 May. The expression of interest form price was set at ₦5 million and the nomination form price at ₦10 million with a 50% discount for women, youth, and candidates with disabilities.

On the primary date, two candidates (Tunde Kelani and Felix Johnson Osakwe) withdrew while the other two candidates continued to an indirect primary in Abuja that ended with Hamza al-Mustapha—former military dictator Sani Abacha's former security officer, close aide, and death squad leader—emerging as the party nominee after results showed al-Mustapha winning over 70% of the delegates' votes. In his acceptance speech, al-Mustapha called for national and party unity before his sole opponent, Samson Odupitan, pledged to support al-Mustapha in the general election. Chukwuka Johnson was nominated as the party's vice presidential nominee.

The Action Democratic Party scheduled its primary for 31 May where the party nominated its national chairman, Yabagi Sani, as its presidential nominee. The nomination was determined using the consensus method which ended in Sani's emergence as nominee. Sani thanked the party in his acceptance speech, noting that the consensus method was beneficial and promising to adhere to party members as their nominee. On 23 June, Udo Okey-Okoro was announced as Sani's running mate.

The Action Peoples Party nominated Osita Nnadi and Isa Hamisu as the party's presidential and vice presidential nominees, respectively.

The years prior to the AAC primary were beset by a party crisis as two groups both claimed to be the legitimate party organization, one faction led by Leonard Nzenwa and the other faction led by party founder Omoyele Sowore. Both politicians claimed to be party chairman with INEC initially recognizing Nzenwa until Sowore was confirmed to be the rightful chair in early June 2022.

The African Action Congress initially scheduled its primary for 1 to 3 June before moving it to 9 June with candidates registering to contest between 6 and 9 May. The party waived fees for both its expression of interest and nomination forms with candidates only having to pay ₦500,000 "obligatory donation" fees with a 25% discount for women and no fees for candidates with disabilities, students, honorably discharged security personnel, teachers, nurses, and emergency service workers.

On the primary date, Sowore was the sole candidate but first resigned as party chairman before the primary in accordance with the party constitution. He then won the nomination by acclamation. At the end of the month, Haruna Garba Magashi—a lawyer from Kano State—was unveiled as the vice presidential nominee in Abuja.

During the 2019 elections, the ADC solidified its place as one of the larger minor parties by becoming the fourth largest party in the House of Representatives and taking a distant fourth in the presidential race. However, the party faced difficulty as the majority of its legislators decamped to different parties during their terms.

The African Democratic Congress initially scheduled its primary for 1 June but rescheduled it for 8 June with forms being sold from 24 March to 24 May. The expression of interest form price was set at ₦5 million and the nomination form price at ₦20 million with forms being free for women, youth, and candidates with disabilities.

Ahead of the primary in Abeokuta, it was noted that the ADC had a high number of aspirants compared to other smaller parties with analysts viewing two as the major contenders: Dumebi Kachikwu—Roots Television Nigeria founder and brother of former minister Ibe Kachikwu along with Kingsley Moghalu—a former Central Bank official. On the primary date, the candidates contested an indirect primary that ended with Kachikwu emerging as the presidential nominee after results showed him winning just under 50% of the delegates' votes. A few days later, Moghalu left the party in protest amid allegations that Kachikwu's win was mainly due to bribes given to delegates. Kachikwu denied the allegations and claimed that it was Moghalu that attempted bribery; however, a few days later, American assets of Kachikwu were seized and a previous seizure related to the William J. Jefferson corruption case resurfaced leading to questions on his credibility. The party first nominated Ahmed Mani for the vice presidency as a placeholder before picking Malika Sani later in June; however, Sani's nomination fell through and about a month later, Kachikwu announced Ahmed Buhari—an oil and gas consultant from Niger State—as his substantive running mate. Soon afterward, the party descended into crisis as factions attempted to expel Kachikwu.

The Allied Peoples Movement initially scheduled its primary for 30 May but rescheduled it for 9 June. Party chairman Yusuf Mamman Dantalle was the sole candidate and won the nomination unopposed at the party secretariat. Princess Chichi Ojei was then nominated as the party's vice presidential nominee. However, Dantalle withdrew from the nomination in July and Ojei was nominated in his place. She later picked Ibrahim Mohammed as running mate.

In 2021 and 2022, APGA retained the Anambra State governorship by a substantial margin and gained a senator through defection, cementing its place as the nation's third largest party. However, the party rarely expands out from its southeastern base and has not obtained over a percent of the vote in any presidential election since 2003.

The All Progressives Grand Alliance scheduled its primary for 1 June 2022 with ward congresses set for 10 May to elect delegates for the primary. The expression of interest form price was set at ₦5 million and the nomination form price at ₦20 million with a 50% discount for women and candidates with disabilities; forms were to be sold from 29 March to 11 April but the deadline was extended to 15 April.

On primary day, Peter Umeadi—former Chief Judge of Anambra State—was the sole presidential candidate and was nominated by voice vote. Abdullahi Muhammed Koli, a labour union activist from Bauchi State, was announced as Umeadi's vice presidential running mate on 12 June.

The Boot Party nominated Sunday Adenuga and Mustapha Usman Turaki as the party's presidential and vice presidential nominee, respectively.

In 2021, a number of politicians and activists led by Patrick Utomi, Attahiru Jega, and Femi Falana announced an effort to find a party to lead a "Third Force" alliance in an attempt to unseat the APC and the PDP. After a number of delays, in May 2022, the group adopted the Labour Party as its platform with hopes of forming an alliance with a number of other smaller parties. The party received another boost when former Governor of Anambra State Peter Obi joined the party in May 2022 to continue his presidential campaign after leaving the PDP. Obi was welcomed into the party by its leadership which also used the announcement to attack the APC and PDP as well as commit to the party manifesto. However, the party had to contend with deep divisions as a factional crisis from 2018 is still in the courts.

The Labour Party initially scheduled its primary for 3 June but rescheduled it for 30 May. It set the price for expression of interest and nomination forms at ₦30 million. On the day of the primary, 104 delegates gathered in Asaba for the primary but no election was needed as three of four candidates—Utomi, Olubusola Emmanuel-Tella, and Joseph Faduri—withdrew in favour of Obi. Obi then won the primary unanimously with only a sole invalid vote not going for him. In his acceptance speech, he promised to revolutionize the nation economically and mobilize an effective general election campaign. A few days after the primary, the other Labour faction held its own parallel primary but INEC recognized the Obi-won election. On 17 June, the party submitted the name of Doyin Okupe—a physician and former PDP candidate who became the Director-General of the Obi Campaign Organisation—as a placeholder vice presidential nominee to be substituted for someone else at a later date. On July 7, Okupe formally withdrew ahead of the announcement of Obi's substantive running mate. The next day, Yusuf Datti Baba-Ahmed—a businessman who previously served as Senator for Kaduna North—was announced as the party's vice presidential nominee. Analysts noted the regional balance of the ticket as Baba-Ahmed is a northerner but questioned his electoral experience as he has not won an election since 2011; at the same time, pundits said his prominent Zaria-based family and technocratic image could help Obi.

The National Rescue Movement scheduled its primary for 1 and 2 June; setting its expression of interest form price at ₦1.5 million and nomination form price at ₦17.5 million with a 50% discount for women, youth, and candidates with disabilities. At the primary, Okwudili Nwa-Anyajike—a businessman—defeated seven other candidates to win the nomination by a margin of over 60% of the vote. However, when INEC released its provisional nominee list, Nwa-Anyajike had been substituted for Felix Johnson Osakwe—a withdrawn AA presidential candidate; Nwa-Anyajike and other party members allege that Osakwe colluded with a portion of NRM leadership to forge Nwa-Anyajike's withdrawal and substitute Osakwe as the nominee. When the INEC final nominee list was released in September, Osakwe's name remained as the party presidential nominee with Yahaya Muhammad Kyabo as vice presidential nominee.

In early 2022, former Governor of Kano State Rabiu Musa Kwankwaso and many of his allies defected from the PDP to join the NNPP. Within a few weeks, a number of other politicians (mainly from the North, especially Kano State) joined the party and Kwankwaso was named national leader of the party in preparation for his presidential campaign.

The New Nigeria Peoples Party initially scheduled its primary for 1 and 2 June 2022 before pushing it back to 8 June. To elect delegates for the primary, ward and local government congresses were set for 22 and 25 April, respectively. The expression of interest form price was set at ₦10 million and the nomination form price at ₦20 million with those forms being sold from 10 to 15 April.

Ahead of the primary, the party attempted to woo Peter Obi to be Kwankwaso's running mate but he instead went to the Labour Party; as an alternative, presidential candidate Olufemi Ajadi stepped down and agreed to be Kwankwaso's running mate. Ajadi's withdrawal left Kwankwaso unopposed in the primary. On 8 June, Kwankwaso won the nomination by voice vote at the primary in Velodrome of the Moshood Abiola National Stadium. The party would later nominate Ladipo Johnson instead of Ajadi as a placeholder vice presidential nominee while negotiations with the Labour Party resumed. After the negotiations failed, Isaac Idahosa—a Lagos-based pastor originally from Edo State—was named as the substantive vice presidential nominee on 14 July.

The People's Redemption Party first scheduled its primary for 28 May but moved it to 4 and 5 June; setting its expression of interest form price at ₦500,000 and its nomination form price at ₦10 million with a 50% discount for women candidates and free nomination forms for candidates with disabilities. In the primary, Kola Abiola—businessman and the son of former president-elect M. K. O. Abiola—defeated three other candidates to win the nomination by a margin of over 37% of the vote. Unlike other parties' presidential primaries, the PRP had delegates vote from their state events instead of holding one central primary. In the weeks after the primary, Ribi Marshal was nominated as the party's vice presidential nominee; he was replaced by Haro Haruna Zego in the final INEC nominee list.

The Social Democratic Party initially scheduled its primary for 28 to 30 May 2022 but one faction instead scheduled its primary for 8 June while the another faction held its primary on 31 May. Ward/LGA and state congresses were set for 19 May and 20 May, respectively, to elect delegates for the primary. The party set its expression of interest form price at ₦3 million and its nomination form price at ₦32 million with a 50% discount for youth and free forms for women and candidates with disabilities.

The months prior to the SDP primary were beset by a party crisis as two groups both claimed to be the legitimate party organization. On 31 May, the Supo Shonibare-led faction held its primary and nominated Ebenezer Ikeyina—former Senator for Anambra Central—unopposed. On 8 June, the Olu Agunloye-led faction held its primary at the Abuja International Conference Centre and nominated Adewole Adebayo—a lawyer and media mogul—by a wide margin over his sole opponent, Khadijah Okunnu-Lamidi. Adebayo's nomination was recognized by INEC as he and his vice presidential running mate—Yusuf Buhari—were placed on the final nominee list.

The Young Progressives Party initially scheduled its primary for 1 June before moving it to 8 June. It was won by Malik Ado-Ibrahim, the founder of the Reset Nigeria Initiative and son of Ohinoyi of Ebiraland Abdul Rahman Ado Ibrahim, by a large margin over Ruby Isaac. In his acceptance speech, Ado-Ibrahim vowed to unify Nigerians and provide basic services. Kasarachi Enyinna was nominated as the party's vice presidential nominee.

The then-Zenith Labour Party initially scheduled its primary for 1 June before moving it to 8 June; setting its expression of interest form price at ₦5 million and the nomination form price at ₦18 million with free forms for women, youth, and candidates with disabilities. At the primary, Dan Nwanyanwu—the party national chairman—won the nomination on the same day that the party name was changed to the Zenith Progressives Alliance. Ramalan Abubakar was nominated as the party's vice presidential nominee.

Conduct

Electoral timetable 
On 26 February 2022, the Independent National Electoral Commission released a timetable, setting out key dates and deadlines for the election. Months later on 27 May 2022, INEC made a slight revision to the timetable, allowing parties extra time to conduct primaries.

 28 February 2022 – Publication of Notice of Election
 4 April 2022 – First day for the conduct of party primaries
 9 June 2022 – Final day for the conduct of party primaries, including the resolution of disputes arising from them
 10 June 2022 – First day for submission of nomination forms to INEC via the online portal
 17 June 2022 – Final day for submission of nomination forms to INEC via the online portal
 28 September 2022 – Commencement of the official campaign period
 23 February 2023 – Final day of the official campaign period
 25 February 2023 – Election day

Recognized parties and nominees 
After the 2019 elections, INEC deregistered 74 political parties for failing to "satisfy the requirements" of continued registration based on their performances during the elections. The move, which was unsuccessfully challenged in court several times from 2019 to 2022, left the nation with 18 political parties: Accord, the Action Alliance, the Action Democratic Party, the Action Peoples Party, the African Action Congress, the African Democratic Congress, the Allied Peoples Movement, the All Progressives Congress, the All Progressives Grand Alliance, the Boot Party, the Labour Party, the New Nigeria Peoples Party, the National Rescue Movement, the Peoples Democratic Party, the People's Redemption Party, the Social Democratic Party, the Young Progressives Party, and the Zenith Progressives Alliance. In March 2022, INEC announced that no new parties would be registered before the 2023 elections.

Parties were required to submit their presidential and vice presidential nominees between 10 and 17 June 2022. On 25 June, INEC released the provisional list of most recognized presidential and vice presidential nominees. The final list was released on 20 September.

Election administration

Primary and post-primary period 
Party primaries are administered by the parties themselves but must be monitored by Independent National Electoral Commission observers and fall inside the scheduled primary period set by INEC. The commission released the timetable in February 2022 with a final date of 3 June 2022 for party primaries; as this date neared, parties repeatedly asked INEC to extend the deadline by two months. After several refusals, INEC agreed to a shorter extension of six days to 9 June but the decision proved controversial as pundits noted that the PDP was about to hold its primary while the APC had not even screened its candidates. Further criticism arose because INEC initially did not also extend the voter registration deadline in kind.

After the primaries, focus shifted to voter registration and the logistical issues surrounding it. Due to years of IPOB attacks on southeastern INEC offices, the commission's capacity in the region was low in 2022 while in Lagos, a registration drive by market traders in June 2022 that overwhelmed an INEC centre also drew the commission's registration capability into question as the deadline neared. In the wake of the incidents, INEC deployed extra registration machines to Lagos State, Kano State, and some southeastern states. Around the same time, INEC hinted at a potential extension of the registration deadline before a court ruling later in June pushed back the deadline anyway. In compliance with the ruling, INEC set the new deadline for 31 July while simultaneously extending daily registration hours from six to eight. Ahead of the deadline, eleven states declared public holidays for voter registration in an attempt to increase public participation in the political process. After the deadline passed, INEC announced that nearly 12.3 million new voters registered during the exercise. 8.75 million of the new voters were younger than 34, a percentage noted as a potential sign of increased youth participation ahead of the election. After the registration drive, the total registered voters number was about 96.2 million with the North-West and South-West geopolitical zones having the most voters.

As the official campaign period neared, INEC focused on direct public communication and formed the Election Crisis Communication Team in late August. During the team inauguration, commissioner Festus Okoye stated that the group's formation was initiated by the Centre for Democracy and Development to combat misinformation and inform the public on key events to the public; Okoye also said that the commission was in the process of training staff to work polling units. Focus shifted back to registration afterwards, with INEC delisting over 1.1 million invalid registrants in mid-September. Among the final pre-campaign period procedures was the 20 September release of the nominee list along with the reiteration of the timetable.

Campaign period 
The official campaign period began on 28 September 2022 and will end on 23 February 2023. At the start of the campaign period, reports noted the pressure placed on INEC from voters, misinformation, and political parties.

In late October, the commission again announced mass delisting of invalid registrants with 2.78 million enrollees (including the prior 1.1 million invalid registrants) being removed from the list due to double registration, underaged registration, and other issues. At the same event, INEC Chairman Mahmood Yakubu also revealed that the preliminary total valid registrant number was about 93.52 million. In accordance with law, INEC posted registries in each local ward but also released the full registrant list online, asking for the public to help scrutinize the list. Amid the public clamor to inspect the list, thousands of public reports showed clearly underage children as registrants—in response, INEC thanked public investigators then vowed to remove ineligible registrants and prosecute complicit officials.

As campaigning escalated in late 2022, fears rose over electoral violence based on ethnic, regional, and religious sentiments as candidates and their surrogates began extensively using identity politics during campaigning. Similarly, fears rose over media campaign and election coverage and its effects on public discourse; while certain outlets were criticized for biases, other groups were praised for advancing election coverage as Stears Business published the first live election tracker in November.

In terms of election security, a series of attacks on INEC offices in Imo State in December 2022 led to further domestic and international concern despite assurances from security forces that the election would be nonviolent. In the wake of the attacks, the Centre for Democracy and Development called for conflict sensitive media reporting on the election to avoid further violence. In accompaniment with concern over violence, renewed fear of hate speech (especially online) began as the election neared and politicians increasingly employed it as a campaign tactic.

Aside from direct threats to the elections, INEC also raised the alarm about vote-buying to manipulate results as the practice had greatly impacted elections in 2021 and 2022. In a reported attempt to combat vote-buying, the Central Bank redesigned the 200, 500, and 1,000 naira notes in October 2022 and removed older notes from circulation. The move prevented parties from using pre-gathered cash that was attended to be distributed for vote-buying as the elections neared. However, the new policy and its sudden announcement was very controversial, especially as Central Bank Governor Godwin Emefiele—who fled into self-imposed exile in late 2022—refused to personally explain the move to the National Assembly. For the part of INEC, the commission vowed to prevent vote-buying despite previous failed reforms while civil society groups noted that vote-buying was just one of a numbers of potential manipulation tactics, with YIAGA Africa releasing a report detailing electoral malpractice risk factors by state.

As sporadic attacks on southeastern INEC offices continued into the new year, a commission official warned that the election could be forced into postponement if the attacks were not stopped. Although the comment was quickly retracted and the commission promised to hold the election as scheduled, concerns continued considering the deadly attacks—like previous southeastern attacks on INEC, experts stated that the attacks were most likely conducted by violent secessionist groups attempting to "delegitimise the electoral process and boost their separatist agenda." The attacks continued until the election, as did concerns that the election would be postponed at the last moment.

Amid swirling doubts over the election proceeding, INEC released new voter registration data in mid-January 2023. The statistics totaled to 93,469,008 eligible voters after the commission reviewed challenges to over 50,000 registrants in addition to removing more instances of double and underage registration. While there was data on occupation and disability plus a sizeable gender gap—over 4.6 million more men registered than women, focus was mainly directed at the increased youth registration with nearly 40% of all voters being between the ages of 18 and 34. Geographic data showed fairly stark contrasts between regions as the North-West and South-West led in total voters while the North East and South East trailed behind. Around the same time, INEC twice extended the deadline for PVC collection in wake of public calls for an extension. A few weeks after the final deadline elapsed, the commission released Permanent Voter Card collection statistics on 23 February that showed a total of 87,209,007 voters (93.3% of all registered voters) had collected their PVCs. In the final days of the campaign period, INEC vowed that the election would be free, safe, secure, timely, and transparent with hundreds of thousands of security personnel, 229 foreign and domestic observer groups, and thousands of INEC staffers.

Election day and collation period 
On election day, widespread reports of delayed starts to voting emerged with YIAGA Africa estimating that only 41% of polling units had commenced voting by 9:30am, an hour after voting was scheduled to start. Similarly, SBM Intelligence reported that only 41.3% of polling units had opened on time while Nigeria Civil Society Situation Room data claimed less than 30% of units had started by 8:30 am, with other reports claiming that the currency crisis had precluded INEC from paying cash to transporters prior to election day which led some drivers to refuse to convey INEC materials or personnel. SBM also noted that turnout was high and there were relatively few violent incidents nationwide while some groups observed newly adapted vote buying efforts due to the currency crisis like bribing using West African CFA francs or non-monetary inducements. However, there were notable reports of violence in certain areas, most notably in Lagos State where thugs alleged to be aligned with the APC targeted predominantly ethnic minority areas. Additionally, several attacks on journalists by unknown assailants or even security personnel occurred throughout election day. Although INEC Chairman Mahmood Yakubu acknowledged several problems at his 1pm briefing and called on voters to stay at polling units, civil groups called on INEC to extend voting past the 2:30pm deadline. The first announced postponements came later in the day when INEC suspended voting in 141 Bayelsa State units where there were disruptions, rescheduling the voting for 26 February. INEC later extended voting to the next day in parts of Cross River State and Kogi State as well.

Later in the day, focus turned to turnout and results collation. On turnout, SBM Intelligence released a state-by-state turnout projection, estimating that overall turnout had risen compared to 2019 and that everywhere but Kwara and Ogun had turnout higher than 30%. Although INEC had announced that collation centres would only open at noon on 26 February, the commission had long promised to upload polling unit results to its INEC result viewing portal (IReV) on election day; however, no results were uploaded for most of the day, leading to protests by the civil society groups and online citizens. The Obi campaign also decried the lack of uploads, claiming the act drew the election's fairness into doubt and noting that legislative results had already been uploaded; Labour Party Chairman Julius Abure went as far to claim that compromised or threatened INEC officials were holding back results from Obi-supporting areas of Lagos and Delta states. Around 10:45 pm on the night of 25 February, INEC finally began uploading data to the portal. 

By 6 am in the morning of 26 February, only about 10% of polling unit results had been uploaded as journalists noted the rising potential for further doubt in election credibility due to the delay. Later in the morning, voting in rescheduled units commenced while newly released civil society reports commended voters but decried suppression and poor administration. By the opening of the national collation centre around 1pm, more results had been uploaded but no full state results were communicated at the centre yet. Meanwhile, INEC released a statement that blamed "technical hitches" for the delayed uploads of results in the wake of further protests by both the PDP and LP. By the end of the day, only Ekiti State results were announced at the national centre while the results in Osun and Ondo were announced at the state collation centres but did not reach the national centre before it closed for the day. On the other hand, voting was further postponed in some areas, with significant controversy surrounding the election in Abia State and its INEC administrators.

On 27 February, criticism of INEC continued with international observers and the Nigeria Labour Congress lambasting the commission's lack of transparency amidst the delays. Similarly, agents of political parties (notably including PDP and LP agents) at the national collation centre protested the prolonged delay in uploading results on iReV, even in states where final results had been announced along with discrepancies in result totals. Meanwhile, final results came in from Adamawa, Enugu, Gombe, Katsina, Kwara, Lagos, Ogun, Oyo, and Yobe by the afternoon. However, the collation centre protests culminated in an agent walkout by the representatives of the LP and PDP alongside multiple other parties' agents.

By the early morning of 28 February, more results were reported from Akwa Ibom, Bauchi, Bayelsa, Benue, Cross River, Delta, the Federal Capital Territory, Jigawa, Kaduna, Kano, Nasarawa, Niger, Plateau, Sokoto, and Zamfara. However, criticism of the process from domestic and international observers continued, with the European Union observer mission noting "lack of transparency and operational failures" that "reduced trust in the process" while other groups echoed similar displeasure. These reports, along with further disputes over the process, led the campaigns of Abubakar, Obi, and Kwankwaso to fully reject the results of the election on 28 February and call for a new election to be conducted.

Regardless of protests, Yakubu continued accepting state-by-state results throughout 28 February and into the early hours of 1 March; in this time, the remaining states reported vote totals: Abia, Anambra, Borno, Ebonyi, Edo, Imo, Kebbi, Kogi, and Taraba in addition to notably including the heavily disputed results from Rivers State. After the state results were reported and accepted by the national collation centre, Yakubu stated "Tinubu Bola Ahmed of the APC, having satisfied the requirements of the law is hereby declared the winner and returned elected" in the early morning of 1 March. All three major opposing campaigns rejected and vowed to challenge the results.

Campaign

Issues

Timeline

Pre-campaign period 

28 April 2021: The Independent National Electoral Commission (INEC) announces 18 February 2023 as the election day.
10 November 2021: APGA nominee Charles Chukwuma Soludo is declared winner of the off-cycle Anambra State gubernatorial election that took place on 6 November; the PDP and APC nominees come distant second and third places, respectively.
28 January 2022: Then-aspirant Bola Tinubu goes to London, reportedly on a medical trip; the trip comes just a few months after Tinubu returned from a three-month medical stay in the United Kingdom.
26 February 2022: INEC revises the election date, moving the election to 25 February 2023 and releasing the rest of the electoral timetable.
16 March 2022: The Peoples Democratic Party announces its primary schedule, setting 28 and 29 May as its primary days.
20 April 2022: The All Progressives Congress announces its primary schedule, setting 30 May and 1 June as its primary days.
12 May 2022: In the wake of the Lynching of Deborah Yakubu, then-aspirant Atiku Abubakar is heavily criticized for deleting a tweet condemning the murder.
25 May 2022: 
Then-aspirant Atiku Abubakar releases his five-point governance agenda along with his full policy document.
Major PDP aspirant—Peter Obi—withdraws from the party's primary and defects to the Labour Party.
27 May 2022: INEC slightly revises its electoral timetable, allowing parties an extra six days to conduct primaries.
28 May 2022: 
The APC revises its primary schedule, delaying the primary to 6–8 June.
The PDP holds its primary in Abuja, nominating former Vice President Atiku Abubakar over Nyesom Wike, Bukola Saraki, and nine other candidates.
30 May 2022: The LP holds its primary in Asaba, nominating Obi unopposed.
7 and 8 June 2022: The APC holds its primary in Abuja, nominating former Governor of Lagos State Bola Tinubu over Rotimi Amaechi, Yemi Osinbajo, and eleven other candidates.
16 June 2022: Abubakar picks Ifeanyi Okowa—the Governor of Delta State—as the PDP vice presidential nominee.
17 June 2022: 
Tinubu picks Kabir Ibrahim Masari—a party operative—as the APC placeholder vice presidential nominee to be substituted for someone else at a later date.
Obi picks Doyin Okupe—the Obi campaign manager—as the LP placeholder vice presidential nominee to be substituted for someone else at a later date.
18 June 2022: Rabiu Kwankwaso, the New Nigeria Peoples Party presidential nominee and the former Governor of Kano State, and Okupe both announce productive discussions between minor parties on forming a coalition for the elections.
19 June 2022: APC nominee Abiodun Oyebanji is declared winner of the off-cycle Ekiti State gubernatorial election that took place the day before; the PDP nominee comes a distant third place.
24 June 2022: Documentation submitted by Tinubu to INEC is released, revealing that he did not state the primary or secondary school he attended. The new form reignited the longtime certificate and personal history controversies around Tinubu as the form was in direct contradiction with previous sworn forms and public statements.
5 July 2022: Okupe announces that LP-NNPP coalition talks have collapsed.
7 July 2022: Okupe formally withdraws as LP vice presidential nominee.
8 July 2022: Obi picks Yusuf Datti Baba-Ahmed—former Senator for Kaduna North—as the substantive LP vice presidential nominee.
10 July 2022: 
Ibrahim Masari formally withdraws as APC vice presidential nominee.
Tinubu picks Kashim Shettima—Senator for Borno Central and former Governor of Borno State—as the substantive APC vice presidential nominee.
14 July 2022: Abubakar returns to Nigeria after spending weeks abroad on an undisclosed trip.
17 July 2022: PDP nominee Ademola Adeleke is declared winner of the off-cycle Osun State gubernatorial election that took place the day before, gaining the office for the party; the APC nominee comes a close second place.
20 July 2022: The appearance of people wearing liturgical garments at the formal Shettima nomination rally leads to controversy as the APC claims the people are clergy while Christian groups and activists mock the group as paid actors without genuine congregations.
1 August 2022: After the end of the voter registration period the day before, INEC announces nearly 12.3 million new registered voters.
15 September 2022: The first public presidential poll is released. Conducted by NOI Polls for the Anap Foundation, the results show Obi in a slight lead at 21% with Tinubu and Abubakar close behind at 13% each.
20 September 2022: 
Ezenwo Nyesom Wike (PDP)—Governor of Rivers State and runner-up in the PDP presidential primary—withdraws from the Abubakar campaign along with several of his allies. The grouping, which had been feuding with Abubakar for months, announced their refusal to assist the PDP presidential campaign until PDP Chairman Iyorchia Ayu—an Abubakar ally from Benue State—left his position in favor of a southerner.
INEC releases the final list of recognized presidential and vice presidential nominees.

Campaign period 

28 September 2022: 
 Official campaign period commences.
 The PDP Presidential Campaign Council (composition) is inaugurated at the formal commencement of the Abubakar campaign.
29 September 2022: Most candidates along with parties' chairmen sign a peace accord in Abuja; Tinubu is absent and sends Shettima as his representative.
6 October 2022: Tinubu returns to Nigeria after spending over a week abroad on an undisclosed trip.
15 October 2022: Abubakar says that 'northerners do not need Yoruba or Igbo candidates' at an event. The comment is heavily criticized by civil society organisations and opposing campaigns for stoking ethnic divisions.
21 October 2022: Tinubu releases his eight-point policy agenda along with his full manifesto before the revised APC Presidential Campaign Council (composition) is inaugurated at the formal commencement of his campaign.
28 October 2022: The revised LP Presidential Campaign Council (composition) is inaugurated.
29 October 2022: A rally in Lafia marks the formal commencement of the Obi campaign.
6 November 2022: The first multi-candidate presidential town hall is hosted by Arise News and the Centre for Democracy and Development; while Obi and Kwankwaso attend, Abubakar was represented by Okowa and Tinubu declined to attend.
8 November 2022: News outlets publish newly certified United States District Court for the Northern District of Illinois' documents outlining Tinubu's forfeiture of $460,000 alleged to be the proceeds of drug dealing in 1993.
14 November 2022: The second multi-candidate presidential town hall is hosted by Arise News and the Centre for Democracy and Development for minor candidates; four candidates attended: Omoyele Sowore (AAC), Yabagi Sani (ADP), Peter Umeadi (APGA), and Adewole Adebayo (SDP).
18 November 2022: A poll on rural communities is released by Nextier; the results show Obi leading at 40% with Abubakar in second at 27%, Tinubu in third at 20%, and Kwankwaso in fourth at 5%.
20 November 2022: Wike and four other allied PDP governors form the "Integrity Group" at a meeting in Lagos, continuing the anti-Abubakar movement within the PDP.
3 December 2022: Obi releases his seven policy priorities along with his full manifesto.
4 December 2022: The third multi-candidate presidential town hall is hosted by Arise News and the Centre for Democracy and Development with Abubakar, Obi, and Kwankwaso in attendance; days prior Tinubu had announced his boycott due to alleged media bias against him.
12 December 2022: An attack on an INEC office in Owerri is repulsed, but a police officer is killed along with three assailants. It is the third attack on INEC installations in Imo State since the start of the month, amidst rising concerns over violence during the electoral process.
20 December 2022: Okupe resigns as Obi campaign director-general a day after being convicted for money laundering in connection to the 2015 Dasukigate scandal.
8 January 2023: Audio alleged to be of Abubakar from June 2018 is released by his former aide Mike Achimugu. In the recording, Abubakar describes the methods he and then-President Olusegun Obasanjo used to siphon public funds during their 1999—2007 administration.
11 January 2023: 
INEC vows to hold the elections as scheduled, a day after a commission official warned that the elections could be postponed if the wave of attacks on INEC offices was not abated.
INEC releases the final voter registration statistics, with a total of 93,469,008 eligible voters.
7 February 2023: Stears releases the results of its national poll in accompaniment with a predictive model; results show Obi in the lead but with the caveat that Obi's lead would grow if turnout was high while Tinubu would lead if turnout was low.
9 February 2023: The National Universities Commission orders the closure of all universities from 22 February to 14 March, a move intended to both allow students to return home to vote and assuage concerns about university safety in case of election turmoil.
22 February 2023: Candidates along with other notable political figures sign a peace accord in Abuja.
23 February 2023: 
INEC releases the Permanent Voter Card collection statistics, with a total of 87,209,007 voters (93.3% of all registered voters) having collected their PVCs by the end of the collection window.
Official campaign period ends.

Summary

Pre-campaign period 
For both nominees of the major party, the early parts of the general election campaign in June and July 2022 were dominated by attempts to unify their parties amid the search for a running mate. For Tinubu, the selection of Ibrahim Masari as a placeholder running mate in mid-June bought the APC several weeks to continue party reconciliation efforts as controversy swirled over the religious affiliation of Tinubu's potential running mates. On the other hand, Abubakar had to contend with a burgeoning party crisis as allies of Governor Nyesom Wike—first runner up in the PDP primary—began to publicly protest against the perceived disrespect towards Wike; their protests centered around Abubakar's disregard for a party committee recommendation of Wike for the vice presidential nomination but some PDP figures also objected to Abubakar in general due to the violation of zoning. The upheaval reached the point of Wike allies publicly questioning if they would support Abubakar and privately threatening to leave the party while national party chairman Iyorchia Ayu's neutrality was questioned and Abubakar himself spent weeks abroad in the midst of the crisis. As the PDP desperately attempted to reconcile Wike and Abubakar, Obi and Kwankwaso held meetings with Wike in an attempt to bring him into their respective parties. These meetings took place as representatives of Obi and Kwankwaso were also meeting in an attempt to form a NNPP-LP coalition; however, these negotiations were derailed in early July when Kwankwaso publicly refused to be Obi's vice presidential running mate on the grounds that northerners would not vote for a southeasterner. A few days later, Obi's campaign announced that the coalition discussions had failed and that the campaign had shifted towards the search for a vice presidential nominee which ended in the selection of Baba-Ahmed. As the LP ticket constituted, the PDP crisis continued as Wike publicly met with several APC governors on 8 July while Abubakar extended his stay abroad despite the party infighting, Eid al-Kabir, and the Osun gubernatorial election campaign in mid-July. For Tinubu, when he finally selected Shettima as his running mate on 10 July, immediate blowback confronted his campaign amid accusations of religious intolerance for the Muslim-Muslim ticket with even some other APC members condemning the ticket. Later in July, Abubakar returned to the nation while Tinubu was in a difficult position as backlash against the APC ticket continued and his relative—incumbent Osun Governor Gboyega Oyetola—lost to PDP nominee Ademola Adeleke in the Osun gubernatorial election; similarly, questions emerged over Labour's weak showings in both Osun and Ekiti. Takeaways from the gubernatorial election focused on the potential impact of the PDP's victory on the presidential race and the extremely successful election administration from INEC. To make matters worse for the Tinubu campaign, the appearance of people wearing liturgical garments of various Christian denominations at Shettima's nomination rally on 20 July led to further backlash since observers noted the group's lack of identification and the Christian Association of Nigeria publicly challenged the APC to name the supposed clergy.

By late July and early August, Tinubu and Abubakar continued to face high-profile dissent from within their own parties as prominent northern Christian APC members—like former Secretary to the Government of the Federation Babachir David Lawal and former Speaker of the House of Representatives Yakubu Dogara—publicly condemned the same religion APC ticket while Wike and his allies continued their public criticism of Abubakar and PDP leadership. In response, Tinubu appointed Governor of Plateau State Simon Lalong—a northern Christian—as the Director-General of his Campaign Council while in early August, Abubakar and Wike finally met for the first time since Okowa's selection and agreed on a reconciliation framework. However, both the APC and PDP backslid into their respective crises as protests against the APC ticket drew thousands and it continued to come under fire from prominent northern Christians while the opposing camps within the PDP had returned to public squabbling by mid-August. Around the same time, voter registration ended with analysts noting its effect on the race as a whole. The rest of August was dominated by notable meetings as Wike meet with both Tinubu and Obi before another reconciliatory summit with Abubakar; while pundits speculated that Tinubu and Obi attempted to sway Wike to their camps, reporting on the series of Wike-Abubakar talks revealed some of Wike's demands with a focus on the resignation of PDP Chairman Iyorchia Ayu. The location of these meetings in London, United Kingdom sparked controversy as critics labeled the location as insensitive to the plight of Nigerians domestically. Around the same time, observers noted a potential opening for Kwankwaso but even his NNPP devolved into crisis in August as the PDP poached a key Kano State figure from the NNPP amid a threeway fight for the state's massive electorate. Further reporting began to focus on specific states and regions as ThisDay analysis surmised that the PDP was strengthening in previously pro-Buhari states in the North West, the APC was retaining its prime position in the South West but the LP was growing among urban youth, it was Obi vs. Abubakar in the South South and South East, and the North Central was a tossup region. In the weeks afterwards and as candidate profiles were released in preparation for the official campaign period's commencement at the end of September, the PDP desperately attempted to end its crisis by having two northerners holding prominent internal party positions be replaced by southerners but as Ayu remained in office as chairman, Wike continued his public indignation before he and his allies announced their withdrawal from PDP campaigning on 20 September until Ayu left office. Due to the PDP infighting, pundits looking ahead to the campaign period began to speculate on the potential benefits for Tinubu and Obi as several Wike allies are influential in key states. At the same time, the first public poll of the race was released with Obi in the lead; although the campaigns of Abubakar and Tinubu dismissed the results, analysts noted enthusiasm among Obi's base due to his active campaigning as a potential reason for his lead considering both Abubakar and Tinubu devoted more effort to intraparty reconciliation from May to September.

Campaign period 
At the end of September, the official campaign period began with the signing of a peace accord in Abuja by nearly all candidates along with parties' national chairmen; notably, Tinubu was absent with Shettima as his representative. During the week, Abubakar and Tinubu formed their campaign councils amid controversy for both as the Wike dispute continued in the PDP while the composition of the APC campaign council led to internal disquiet. For Obi, his campaign received another positive polling result as he led a Bloomberg News-commissioned poll by a massive margin; he was also buoyed by significant nationwide support rallies on Independence Day but faced difficulties in campaign organizing as his manifesto and campaign council were delayed. Overall, late September and early October was categorized similarly to the pre-campaign period time, with analysis repeatedly noting that Obi was solidifying support and enthusiasm while Abubakar and Tinubu were occupied trying to stop further intraparty rebellion. However, Obi promptly faced scandal due to the controversial initial makeup of his campaign council which forced a retraction and review after backlash from supporters and the LP. A few days later, the race was derailed by a video of Abubakar calling for northerners to reject Yoruba or Igbo candidates; the comment met with widespread condemnation by civil society organisations and opposing campaigns for stoking ethnic divisions. Meanwhile, Tinubu and the APC revised their campaign council to address internal objections before holding a formal campaign commencement on 21 October where Buhari unveiled Tinubu's manifesto before inaugurating the campaign council. Around the same time, campaigning focused on catastrophic nationwide floods with analysts noting that the floods had put more focus on climate change and wider environmental policy issues amid the campaign period. Obi preparations concluded near the end of the month, as the revised LP campaign council was inaugurated on 28 October and the campaign's commencement rally held the next day.

At the start of November, debates began with a series of multi-candidate town halls hosted by Arise News and the Centre for Democracy and Development commencing on 6 November; with a focus on security and the economy, the four most prominent candidates were invited—Abubakar, Kwankwaso, Obi, and Tinubu—but Abubakar sent Okowa as his proxy while Tinubu declined the invitation and was replaced by Kola Abiola, the nominee of the People's Redemption Party. Amid the town halls, controversy swirled for Tinubu as the publication of certified documents from the United States District Court for the Northern District of Illinois detailing his 1993 forfeiture of alleged drug dealing proceeds led to attacks from Obi and Abubakar while the Tinubu campaign claimed that the money was tax-related and analysts speculated on the documents' effect on voting intentions. Meanwhile, Abubakar faced mixed news as the PDP crisis continued with Wike-led, anti-Abubakar PDP governors forming the "Integrity Group" and a rift forming with another incumbent governor in mid-November; on the other hand, a northern APC dissenter group led by former House Speaker Yakubu Dogara endorsed Abubakar on 2 December. Previously, Obi led another poll as a Nextier survey of rural communities released in mid-November showed him in the lead with over 40%. At the beginning of December, various state LP chapters entered crisis but Obi avoided involvement and instead released his oft-delayed manifesto with seven key policy areas. The manifesto release came just before another Arise-CDD town hall; however, Tinubu had announced his boycott of the event due to alleged media bias so only Abubakar, Obi, and Kwankwaso attended on 4 December.

Later in December, the Obi campaign was hit by a court ruling against its Director-General—Doyin Okupe, convicting him of money laundering in connection to the 2015 Dasukigate scandal. Although Okupe appealed the judgment, the controversy led to his resignation from the campaign with journalist Akin Osuntokun replacing him. Meanwhile, the reporting revealed that "Integrity Group" were deliberating over which candidate to endorse at their London meetings in late December; a side attendee of the meetings—former President Olusegun Obasanjo—reportedly advised the group to endorse Obi, which Obasanjo himself later did in a public letter on New Year's Day. Into the new year, analysis shifted to review the chances of each major candidate as the prospect of a runoff looked increasingly possible. While pundits initially contended that Tinubu would benefit from the campaign support of Buhari and the "federal might" of his administration, questions arose over the relationship between Buhari and Tinubu after Buhari skipped several campaign events and defended the controversial new naira notes that Tinubu claimed were an attempt to disrupt his campaign. For Abubakar, reporting focused on two corruption scandals along with his nationwide campaigning (especially in the North). Observers reiterated that Kwankwaso had not appeared to make significant headway outside of his native North West while reports claimed Obi's chances were based on his campaign's ability to successfully turnout voters in the South East in addition to geographically broadening his support across the nation despite the lack of significant LP party structure.

The final month of the campaign period was dominated by the naira crisis and its political implications. The new banknote policy of Buhari and CBN Governor Godwin Emefiele was intended to curb vote buying ahead of the election but poor implementation led to shortages of the new currency. Tinubu and several prominent APC figures publicly broke with Buhari for some of the first times over the policy, first suing to stop its enactment then lambasting the administration after Buhari stood by the policy. For the PDP, the G5 failed to publicize their joint preferred candidate and appeared to split as Benue Governor Samuel Ortom endorsed Obi while Wike reportedly backed Tinubu. For his part, Abubakar focused on his economic plans and national unity in his final campaign stops, rather then party divisions. Similarly, Obi rounded out the campaign with large rallies in Lagos that spotlighted his support of reforms to fight corruption and create jobs; however, the events were marred by violence as mass coordinated attacks on LP supporters before the rallies reinforced fears of further violence on election day. As the campaigns concluded, focus returned to polling as releases from Nextier, Stears, Premise Data for Bloomberg, NIO Polls for the Anap Foundation, and Redfield & Wilton Strategies all issued polls in the months of January and February that showed Obi in the lead and sparking discourse on the surge of polling compared to previous elections. In addition to polling, Stears notably created a predictive model that estimated that Obi would win by a significant margin if voter turnout was high while low turnout would lead to a Tinubu victory. To end the campaign, all candidates signed another peace accord at an Abuja event attended by Buhari, Abubakar, Obi, Kwankwaso, and Tinubu in addition to other candidates and major political figures on 23 February, the final day of the campaign period.

Polling

Graphical summary

Election debates and town halls
At the start of November, fora began as individual town halls moderated by Kadaria Ahmed were held throughout the month while a series of multi-candidate town halls hosted by Arise News and the Centre for Democracy and Development commenced on 6 November. With a focus on security and the economy, the four most prominent candidates were invited—Abubakar, Kwankwaso, Obi, and Tinubu—but Abubakar sent Okowa as his proxy while Tinubu declined the invitation and was replaced by Kola Abiola, the nominee of the People's Redemption Party. The non-attendance sparked controversy as Abubakar and Tinubu were criticized for non-engagement with public debates by the Obi campaign which later vowed to boycott events without the presence of Abubakar or Tinubu. During the debate, Obi labeled poverty as a key source of violence and attacked the incumbent administration on security failures while vowing to remove fuel subsidies; Okowa backed the creation of state police forces along with targeted job creation methods; Kwankwaso identified educational failures as a cause of both insecurity and economic issues; and Abiola labeled poor leadership as a key factor in security failures.

The Arise-CDD series continued with a minor candidate town hall on 14 November where alternative security methods and the economy dominated discussion. Although a Nigerian Economic Summit Group-hosted economic debate was scheduled for the next day, it was canceled due to "prevailing circumstances." Major candidates returned on 4 December to the Arise-CDD series with Obi, Kwankwaso, and Abubakar but Tinubu publicly declined the invitation and accused Arise of biased unprofessionalism. Despite Tinubu's absence, the town hall went ahead with a focus on education, healthcare, poverty, and human capital development—all three candidates lamented poor educational quality and brain drain with Obi targeting low investment in education as the source of the issue. Notably, when asked if they would commit to using Nigerian health services, Abubakar refused while Obi and Kwankwaso acceded. A few weeks later in January, a Nigerian Elections Debate Group-organized debate set for 26 January was postponed due to logistical problems; the debate was instead held on 12 February. Despite inviting all four major candidates, only Kwankwaso and Obi confirmed their attendance; however, technical issues with the Obi campaign airplane prevented him from attending and left just Kwankwaso to answer questions.

Projections

General election

Results

By geopolitical zone

By state

Close states 
States where the margin of victory was under 1%:
 Benue State, 0.28% (2,096 votes) margin for Tinubu
 Sokoto State, 0.55% (3,235 votes) margin for Abubakar
 Katsina State, 0.63% (6,762 votes) margin for Abubakar
 Lagos State, 0.77% (9,848 votes) margin for Obi

States where the margin of victory was between 1% and 5%:
 Osun State, 1.42% (10,421 votes) margin for Abubakar
 Nasarawa State, 3.41% (18,439 votes) margin for Obi
 Jigawa State, 3.78% (34,803 votes) margin for Tinubu

States where the margin of victory was between 5% and 10%:
 Kebbi State, 6.63% (37,087 votes) margin for Abubakar
 Taraba State, 8.55% (42,702 votes) margin for Abubakar
 Akwa Ibom State, 9.61% (53,392 votes) margin for Abubakar

Maps

Aftermath 
The results were announced in the early hours of 1 March 2023. Bola Tinubu of the All Progressives Congress was named the president-elect in a tight election, with Atiku Abubakar and Peter Obi earning substantial votes. Tinubu said, "It (Nigeria) is the only nation we have. It is one country, and we must build together. Let's work together to put broken pieces together…This is a shining moment in the life of any man and an affirmation of our democratic existence. I represent a promise and with your support, I know that promise will be fulfilled."

Although the Independent National Electoral Commission (INEC) called the election free, fair and credible, several observers, including the European Union, said the election was not transparent. A joint observer mission of the International Republican Institute and the National Democratic Institute said, "The election fell well short of Nigerian citizens' reasonable expectations." Samson Itodo, the head of YIAGA Africa, said there were serious concerns about the elections process because major issues such as violence and technical problems had hampered public trust in the election process. The United Nations urged "all stakeholders to remain calm through the conclusion of the electoral process."

Nigeria's main opposition parties said the results of the election were "heavily doctored and manipulated" in a joint news conference. "We won this election as Labour Party, we are going to claim our mandate as Labour Party," said Yusuf Datti Baba-Ahmed, the party's vice presidential candidate. Ndi Kato, the Labour Party's presidential campaign spokesperson, said, "We are defiant. The elections were rigged."

Response

International reactions 
 – Chairperson of the African Union Commission Moussa Faki congratulated Tinubu on 3 March, vowing to support Nigeria in "her journey to deepen democracy, good governance, sustainable development and consolidate peace, security, and stability in the country." Additionally, Faki urged "that any post-election dispute or grievance be pursued through the judicial system."
 – President Patrice Talon congratulated Tinubu on Facebook on 2 March, stating that he looked forward to working together with Tinubu and furthering cooperation between Benin Republic and Nigeria.

 – Transitional President Mahamat Déby congratulated Tinubu on Twitter on 1 March, stating that he looked forward to working together with Tinubu and strengthening bilateral relations.
 – President Xi Jinping congratulated Tinubu on 5 March, noting increased cooperative relations between China and Nigeria in recent years. The brief press release echoed a similar statement by Mao Ning—a Ministry of Foreign Affairs spokesperson—at a press conference on 2 March.
 – President Abdel Fattah el-Sisi congratulated Tinubu on 4 March, also wishing him success in his administration.

 – President Nana Akufo-Addo congratulated Tinubu on Twitter on 2 March, hoping that the new administration would "deepen" the bilateral friendship between Ghana and Nigeria.
 – Prime Minister Narendra Modi congratulated Tinubu on Twitter on 3 March, stating that he "looked forward to further strengthening India-Nigeria bilateral relations".
 – President Alassane Ouattara congratulated Tinubu on Twitter on 3 March, stating that he looked forward to working together with Tinubu and strengthening bilateral relations.

 – President Mohamed Bazoum congratulated Tinubu on Twitter on 3 March, labeling the election as free, democratic, and transparent.

 – Prime Minister Rishi Sunak congratulated Tinubu on Twitter on 1 March, stating that he would "look forward to working together to grow our security and trade ties, opening up opportunities for businesses and creating prosperity in both our countries."
 – In a 1 March statement, the State Department congratulated Tinubu but urged INEC to improve processes before the state elections on 11 March. The release also called on candidates and parties to use legal means to challenge results peacefully.

See also 
 2023 Nigerian elections

Notes

References

 
February 2023 events in Africa
2023
Election and referendum articles with incomplete results